Niels De Schutter (born 8 August 1988) is a Belgian footballer who plays as a defender for Ninove .

References

External links

1988 births
Living people
Belgian footballers
Association football defenders
Belgian Pro League players
Challenger Pro League players
S.C. Eendracht Aalst players
K.S.C. Lokeren Oost-Vlaanderen players
K.V. Oostende players
S.K. Beveren players
K.M.S.K. Deinze players
K.V.K. Ninove players
People from Dendermonde
Footballers from East Flanders